| tries ={{#expr: 
 + 5 + 10 + 3
 + 3 + 5 + 3
 + 6 + 4 + 1
}}
| top point scorer    = Riccardo Bocchino (Italy A)(39 points)
| top try scorer      = Scott Lawson (Scotland A)Romain Martial (France A)Jim Thompson (Scotland A)Manoa Vosawai (Italy A)Simon Webster (Scotland A)Alexander Yanyushkin (Russia)(2 tries)
| venue               = 
| attendance2         = 
| champions           = 
| count               = 1
| runner-up           = 
| website             = IRB Nations Cup
| previous year       = 2008
| previous tournament = 2008 IRB Nations Cup
| next year           = 2010
| next tournament     = 2010 IRB Nations Cup
}}
The 2009 IRB Nations Cup was the fourth edition of the international rugby union tournament, a competition created by the International Rugby Board.  It pits the "A" Teams of the stronger (Tier 1) rugby nations (France A, Italy A and Scotland A) against some of the Tier 2 and 3 nations (Romania, Russia and Uruguay).

For the third consecutive year the event was held in Bucharest, Romania.  Emerging Springboks did not return to defend their title.  Scotland A were the overall winners of the tournament.

The competition format was a modified round-robin whereby each team played 3 of the other 5 teams.  The competition was played over three match days, with three matches played consecutively on each day.

Final standings

Fixtures

Round 1
Report

Round 2
Report

Round 3
Report

Top scorers

Top points scorers

Source: irb.com

Top try scorers

Source: irb.com

See also 

2009 IRB Pacific Nations Cup

References

External links
IRB Overview
IRB Fixtures/Results
IRB Standings

2009
2009 rugby union tournaments for national teams
International rugby union competitions hosted by Romania
2008–09 in Romanian rugby union
2008–09 in Italian rugby union
2008–09 in French rugby union
2008–09 in Scottish rugby union
2009 in Russian rugby union
2009 in Uruguayan sport
Sport in Bucharest